Prunus pleuradenia, the Antilles cherry, is a species of cherry laurel (Laurocerasus, sometimes included in Padus) native to the islands of the Caribbean, particularly the Lesser Antilles. It may also be native to Venezuela. Individuals are small to medium-sized trees, reaching . Some authorities consider it a synonym of Prunus myrtifolia.

References

pleuradenia
Cherries
Plants described in 1860